

Lower Broughton is a locality in the Australian state of South Australia on the east coast of Spencer Gulf about  to the south of the city of Port Pirie and about  north of Adelaide city centre.

The locality was established in June 1995 in respect to “the long established name.”  Its name is derived from “its proximity” to the Broughton River.

Lower Broughton occupies land between the coastline in the west and the Spencer Highway in the east around a section of the Broughton River.  Land use within the locality consists of agriculture with a strip of land along the coastline being zoned for conservation.

Lower Broughton is located within the federal Division of Grey, the state electoral district of Frome and the local government area of the Port Pirie Regional Council.

References

Towns in South Australia
Spencer Gulf